Orrice Abram "Abe" Murdock Jr. (July 18, 1893September 15, 1979) was an American attorney and politician who served as a member of both chambers of the United States Congress for Utah. From 1947 to 1957, he served as a member of the National Labor Relations Board.

Early life and education 
Born in Austin, Nevada, he moved with his parents to Beaver, Utah, in 1898. Murdock attended the public schools and Murdock Academy in Beaver, and the University of Utah at Salt Lake City.

Career 
Murdock studied law and was admitted to the bar in 1922. He was a member of the Beaver city council in 1920 and 1921 and was county attorney in 1923–1924, 1927–1928, and 1931–1932. He served city attorney of Beaver from 1926 to 1933, and was an unsuccessful Democratic candidate for district attorney for the fifth Utah district in 1928.

Murdock was elected as a Democrat to the Seventy-third Congress and was reelected to the three succeeding Congresses, serving from March 4, 1933, to January 3, 1941. Instead of running for reelection in 1940, he challenged incumbent Senator William H. King for the Democratic nomination. King had opposed President Franklin Delano Roosevelt's proposal to expand the Supreme Court and Roosevelt's candidacy for an unprecedented third term, while Murdock was a "100% New Dealer" who strongly supported Roosevelt. Murdock defeated King for the nomination and was elected as a Democrat to the Senate, serving from January 3, 1941, to January 3, 1947. 

Murdock was defeated by Republican Arthur Vivian Watkins in his bid for reelection in 1946. After his defeat, he resumed the practice of law and engaged in agricultural pursuits and livestock raising. From 1947 to 1957, he was a member of the National Labor Relations Board and in 1960 was a member of the Atomic Energy Labor-Management Relations Panel.

Personal life 
Murdock died of natural causes in Bethesda, Maryland, in 1979, and was interred in Mountain View Cemetery in Beaver, Utah.

References

External links 
 

1893 births
1979 deaths
People from Lander County, Nevada
American people of Scottish descent
Latter Day Saints from Utah
Democratic Party members of the United States House of Representatives from Utah
Democratic Party United States senators from Utah
National Labor Relations Board officials
Utah city council members
20th-century American politicians
People from Beaver, Utah
Utah lawyers
University of Utah alumni
Truman administration personnel
Eisenhower administration personnel